El Hadji Assane Dioussé (born 20 September 1997) is a Senegalese professional footballer who plays as a defensive midfielder for Super League Greece club OFI.

Club career

Empoli
Dioussé is a youth product from Empoli. He made his Serie A debut on 23 August 2015 against Chievo Verona.

Saint-Étienne
On 31 July 2017, Assane Dioussé signed a five-year contract with Saint-Étienne.

Loan to Chievo
On 29 January 2019, Dioussé joined on loan to Serie A side Chievo Verona until 30 June 2019.

OFI
On 13 July 2022, Dioussé signed a two-year contract with OFI in Greece.

International career
Dioussé debuted for the Senegal U20s in an Under-20 Four Nations Tournament 3–0 loss to France U20s on 23 March 2017.

Dioussé received his first call up for the Senegal senior national team squad on 28 August 2017, ahead of the following month's 2018 FIFA World Cup qualifying matches against Burkina Faso. On 14 November he made his Senegal debut, when he came on in the 88th minute as a substitute for Alfred N'Diaye in a 2018 FIFA World Cup qualification match against South Africa at the Stade Léopold Sédar Senghor. Senegal beat South Africa, winning the match 2–1.

Career statistics

Club

Honours 
Saint-Étienne

 Coupe de France runner-up: 2019–20

References

1997 births
Living people
Association football midfielders
Senegalese footballers
Senegal international footballers
Senegal youth international footballers
Empoli F.C. players
AS Saint-Étienne players
A.C. ChievoVerona players
MKE Ankaragücü footballers
OFI Crete F.C. players
Serie A players
Ligue 1 players
Championnat National 2 players
Süper Lig players
Super League Greece players
Senegalese expatriate footballers
Senegalese expatriate sportspeople in Italy
Expatriate footballers in Italy
Senegalese expatriate sportspeople in France
Expatriate footballers in France
Senegalese expatriate sportspeople in Turkey
Expatriate footballers in Turkey
Senegalese expatriate sportspeople in Greece
Expatriate footballers in Greece